Madrakah is a village in Makkah Province, in western Saudi Arabia. It is noted as being the first Saudi municipality to elect a woman, Salma bint Hizab al-Oteibi, to its respective Municipal council.

See also 

 List of cities and towns in Saudi Arabia
 Regions of Saudi Arabia

References

Populated places in Mecca Province